Hárshegy (English:Linden Hill, German: Lindenberg) is a part of Budapest's 2nd district.

The name of the area "Linden Hill" alludes to the geologic history of the area. The Hárshegy Sandstone Formation is named after the region.

Background
During the Middle Ages, Bathory Cave, on the southeastern slope of Nagy-Hárs-hegy, was mined for iron ore.

In the saddle between Hárshegy and János Hill is Szépjuhászné (Beautiful shepherdess), the site of the monastery where the Pauline Order founded their first priory. Bathory Cave was the hermitage of Pauline monk László Báthory, who left the monastic life at the nearby priory to live in the cave for 20 years.

In 1847, Gábor Döbrentei proposed a new name for the Germanic "Lindenberg" given to the area. He proposed , however, the mirror translation Hárshegy, took hold instead.

The area is a popular place for recreation, including camping and hiking. The  on Kis-Hárs Hill offers commanding views of the Buda Hills, Castle Hill, and the Citadella.

Scouting
The 1928 Scouting World Conference was held in Budapest, with a May 6 rally at the Hárshegy Training Park attended by 9,647 Scouts.  The Chief Scout, Lord Robert Baden-Powell of Gilwell visited in Budapest, from May 5–8, 1928. On May 7, he visited at the Hárshegy Training Park, and left his footprint on the sand. The Hungarian scouts made the B-P's Footprint statue in the Harshegy Training Park.

The Hárshegy Training Park was located on Ferenc hill, and the street address of the HQ was Hárshegy út 7. From 1927 and 1948 it was the central leader training park (the Hungarian Gilwell Park) of the Hungarian Scout Association. In 1948, the communist regime destroyed the scout park, and banned the scout movement. The Council Rock is still there.

Gallery

References

Further reading 

Neighbourhoods of Budapest
2nd District of Budapest